Kaiser Kuo (born March 7, 1966) is a Chinese American freelance writer and musician.

Career
Kaiser previously worked as director for international communications for Chinese search engine Baidu. Before that he was a technology correspondent for Red Herring magazine, and also worked as director of digital strategy, China, for Ogilvy & Mather in Beijing. He used to write a column for the foreigner-focused English-language magazine The Beijinger from 2001 to 2011.

In 2010, Kaiser started the Sinica show, a current affairs podcast based in Beijing that invites prominent China journalists and China-watchers to participate in uncensored discussions about Chinese political and economic affairs. Guests and co-hosts have included Gady Epstein, Mary Kay Magistad of Public Radio International, Tania Branigan of The Guardian, Evan Osnos of The New Yorker, Arthur Kroeber of Dragonomics, Jeremy Goldkorn of Danwei and Bill Bishop, founder of CBS MarketWatch. Sinica was recorded at the Popup Chinese studios in Beijing from 2010 to 2016. In April 2016,  Kuo announced that the Sinica Podcast was acquired by an unnamed New York startup and that he would return to the United States with his family to focus full-time on Sinica. The podcast is released every Friday.

He is editor-at-large at the digital media company SupChina.

Music
He is a former member of the rock band Tang Dynasty and later formed another Chinese heavy metal rock group, Spring and Autumn. Kaiser's musical involvement also involved playing bass for Dirty Deeds, an AC/DC cover band based in Beijing.

Family
Kaiser's grandfather, Guo Ting-Yi, was a historian of Chinese modern history who founded the Institute of Modern History at Academia Sinica in Taiwan and wrote the "Modern Chinese History" textbook.

See also
 Americans in China
 Chinese rock

References

External links 
 Ich Bin Ein Beijinger Kaiser Kuo's personal weblog

1966 births
Living people
American musicians of Chinese descent
American writers of Chinese descent
American people of Chinese descent
American emigrants to China